The classical virial expansion expresses the pressure P of a many-particle system in equilibrium as a power series in the density:

where  is called the compressibility factor. This is the virial equation of state, the most general function relating pressure, density, and temperature, of fluids. It was first proposed by Kamerlingh Onnes. The compressibility factor is a dimensionless quantity, indicating how much a real fluid deviates from an ideal gas. A is the first virial coefficient, which has a constant value of 1. It makes the statement that at low density, all fluids behave like ideal gases.

Second and third virial coefficients 
The second, and third, virial coefficients have been studied extensively and tabulated for many fluids for more than a century. Two of the most extensive compilations are in the books by Dymond. and NIST Thermo Data Engine Database  and its Web Thermo Tables.  Tables of second and third virial coefficients of many fluids are included in these compilations.

The second and third virial coefficients as functions of temperature are shown in the following figure for argon. Reduced temperature and reduced virial coefficients, scaled by respective critical properties, are all dimensionless.  Notice in the figure that the second virial coefficient decreases monotonically as temperature is lowered. However, the third virial coefficient has a bell shape. It increases as temperature is lowered to the critical temperature, then it passes through a peak and decreases rapidly to zero as temperature is lowered from the critical point to the triple point. It is physically unreasonable for it to decrease below the critical temperature.  This is because the third virial coefficient theoretically represents the repulsive force among molecules, which is expected to increase at a lower temperature, as molecules are pressed together.  The behaviors just described are similar to many other gases, as shown in the figure below.

The reason why the third virial coefficient decreases below the critical temperature is as follows. Generally, the PρT isotherms are measured in the gaseous phase. Below the critical temperature, the gaseous phase condenses and coexists with the liquid phase, and the PρT isotherm becomes flat. Saturation pressure does not change until the gas condenses completely to liquid, and then pressure rises as density increases. There is a large gap between pure gaseous phase and pure liquid phase where no useful pressure data, except saturation pressure, are available. If only data in the gaseous phase were analyzed, the third virial coefficient becomes very small, because the PρT isotherm is almost linear in the gaseous phase. However, if data points in the pure liquid phase are included, a second-order regression would give a large third virial coefficient. The third virial coefficient thus derived would increase monotonically as the temperature is lowered from the critical point to the triple point.

The expectation that the third virial coefficient is a monotonically increasing function of  can be verified with equations of state which accurately predicted the PρT isotherms in the saturation region where gaseous and liquid phases coexist.

Casting equations of the state into virial form 

Most equations of state can be reformulated and cast in virial equations to evaluate and compare their implicit second and third virial coefficients. The seminal Van der Waals equation of state was proposed in 1873:

where  is molar volume. It can be rearranged by expanding  into a Taylor series:

In the Van der Waals equation, the second virial coefficient has roughly the correct behavior, as it decreases monotonically when the temperature is lowered. The third and higher virial coefficients are independent of temperature, and are not correct, especially at low temperatures. 

Almost all subsequent equations of state derived from the Van der Waals equation, like those from Dieterici, Berthelot, Redlich-Kwong, Peng-Robinson, etc., suffer from the singularity introduced by 1/(v - b).  Hence they cannot represent accurately the PρT isotherms at temperatures below critical temperature. Many of them produce adequate second virial coefficients, but most give incorrect third virial coefficients .

Other equations of state, started by Beattie-Bridgeman, however, are more closely related to virial equations, and show to be more accurate in representing behavior of fluids in both gaseous and liquid phases. They can be reformulated into virial equations of state, and compared with one another. The Beattie-Bridgeman equation of state, proposed in 1928, 

where

can be rearranged:

This equation of state represents well the second virial coefficient. However, the third virial coefficient has the wrong sign. Thus, it fails to represent isotherms close to and below the critical temperature.

The Benedict-Webb-Rubin equation of state of 1940 represents better isotherms below the critical temperature:

More improvements are achieved by Starling in 1972:

Following are plots of reduced second and third virial coefficients against reduced temperature according to Starling:

The exponential terms in the last two equations correct the third virial coefficient so that the isotherms in the liquid phase can be represented correctly. It thus contributes a  term to the third virial coefficient, and one term to the eighth virial coefficient, which can be ignored.

After the expansion of the exponential terms, the Benedict-Webb-Rubin and Starling equations of state have this form:

The fourth and fifth virial coefficients are zero. After the third virial term, the next significant term is the sixth virial coefficient.

Re-analysis of the data by Starling 

Re-analyzing the data reported by Starling, the virial coefficients are best represented by

The data by Starling  are re-analyzed and the results are shown in the following table. These coefficients are all dimensionless, they are all scaled with critical molar volumes and critical temperature.

Cubic virial equation of state 
The three-term virial equation or a cubic virial equation of state

Theoretically, the second virial coefficient represents bimolecular attraction forces, and the third virial term represents the repulsive forces among three molecules in close contact.

With this cubic virial equation, the coefficients B and C can be solved in closed form. Imposing the critical conditions:

the cubic virial equation can be solved to yield:
  and 
 is therefore 0.333, comparing to 0.375 from Van der Waals equation of state.

Between the critical point and the triple point is the saturation region of fluids. In this region, the gaseous phase coexists with the liquid phase under saturation pressure , and the saturation temperature . These are the saturation properties needed to compute second and third virial coefficients.

It can be rearranged as:

The factor  is the volume of saturated gas according to the ideal gas law, and can be given a unique name :

In the saturation region, the cubic equation has three roots, and can be written alternatively as:

which can be expanded as:

The cubic equations are identical. Therefore, from the linear terms in these equations,  can be solved:

From the quadratic terms, B can be solved:

And from the cubic terms, C can be solved:

The results are generally in agreement with those computed from Benedict-Webb-Rubin and Starling equations of state. The measurement errors thus introduced into B and C should be considered when one compares the values thus derived with those derived from second order regression analysis of PρT isotherms.

Gas-liquid-solid equilibrium 

The cubic virial equation of state accurately represents the gas-liquid equilibrium of most substance from the critical point down to the triple point, where solid phase starts to appear. It can be extended to account for the gas-liquid-solid equilibrium:

In this equation, the first term  represents the pressure generated by kinetic energy of molecules. The second term  represents long-range bimolecular attraction. The third term  represents short-range tri-molecular repulsion. The second term pulls the PVT isotherm down as volume is reduced, while the third term pushes the isotherm up. When the temperature is below the critical point, the PVT isotherm thus has an S-shaped bent which allows a liquid phase to coexist with the prevalent gaseous phase.

Now, if we had a  term to pull the PVT isotherm down in the liquid phase, and a  terms to push it back up, a solid phase could be created, as these two terms producing another S-shaped bend between liquid and solid. It was demonstrated  that such an S shaped bend could be synthesized using a -function like Lorentzian function over a van der Waals equation of state. Such an equation of state is difficult to manipulate mathematically.  In contrast, a virial equation is easier to handle.

Argon is used to evaluate realistically this extended virial equation for gas-liquid-solid equilibrium. Data will be analyzed in reduced forms. All PVT variables are scaled by their respective critical values. It is expect from the principle of corresponding states that the results would apply to other well behaved fluids. The relevant data of argon are summarized in the following table:

 must be slightly larger than the volume of solid argon, 0.33, and  must be between the volumes of liquid and solid argon. Initially,  is set to the volume of solid, to produce the last sharply rising edge of the isotherm where solid phase appears at very low volume. The exponential  must be then determined so that the valley in the n-2n potential must fit between the volumes of solid (0.33) and liquid (0.378). After the exponential n is determined, the value of  can be adjusted to satisfy the Gibbs Rule, which requires that the Gibbs free energy of liquid phase and that of solid phase must be equal under the triple point temperature and pressure.

To produce a solid phase in argon, the exponential value n must be very large, larger than 20; otherwise, the PVT isotherm would not bend to an S-shape between liquid and solid. The isotherm is shown in the right figure, in which three virial terms are plotted separately for clarity:

In this figure,  represents the sum of the first three virial terms, of the cubic virial equation, and it shows the behavior of argon in its gaseous and liquid phases.  represents the potential contributed from the  term, and  represents the contributions from the  term.

It is surprising that n has to be greater than 20 to produce a solid phase. It is well known that the Lenard-Jones 6-12 potential can be used to compute the second virial coefficient from quantum mechanical principles. Quantum mechanical reasoning relates the second virial coefficient to bimolecular attraction, and the third coefficients to tri-molecular repulsion, etc. In the liquid phase of argon, one atom is surrounded by 12 nearest neighbors and up to 32 next-to-nearest neighbors. In the solid phase, all atoms are locked in place, and the number of interacting neighbors is infinite. Therefore, n = 30, or even greater, is reasonable.

As a result, we have a virial equation of state to describe quantitatively the gas-liquid-solid equilibrium for argon, and all fluids which observe the principle of corresponding states, at its triple point:

Virial equations of state  
From Benedict-Webb-Rubin and Starling equations of state, it was determined that the best virial equation of state should take the form of  The second and third virial coefficients in this equation can be computed from experimental PρT data using a linear regression. After removing the first three virial terms, the residue in compressibility factor  could then be used to obtain the sixth virial coefficient.

See also 
Virial theorem
Statistical mechanics
Equation of state

References 

Statistical mechanics